Jevrem Kosnić (born 28 April 1993) is a Swiss-born Serbian footballer who plays as a central defender for Italian Serie D club Taranto F.C. 1927.

Born in St. Gallen, Switzerland, Kosnić started playing in Serbia, at FK Rad.

References

External links

1993 births
Living people
Sportspeople from St. Gallen (city)
Swiss people of Serbian descent
Serbian people of Swiss descent
Swiss men's footballers
Serbian footballers
Swiss expatriate footballers
Serbian expatriate footballers
Association football defenders
FK Rad players
FK Bežanija players
Palermo F.C. players
Pisa S.C. players
Budapest Honvéd FC players
FC Universitatea Cluj players
S.S. Fidelis Andria 1928 players
Taranto F.C. 1927 players
Nemzeti Bajnokság I players
Serie C players
Serie D players
Liga II players
Serbian First League players
Expatriate footballers in Italy
Expatriate footballers in Hungary
Expatriate footballers in Romania
Serbia youth international footballers